Nicholas Joseph Derba (born November 9, 1985) is an American baseball coach and former catcher, who is the current head baseball coach of the Maine Black Bears. He played college baseball at Manhattan from 2004–2007, before playing professionally from 2007–2012.

Playing career
Derba played college baseball at Manhattan College. While at Manhattan, he played three years (2004-2006) of collegiate summer baseball for the Chatham A's of the Cape Cod Baseball League, and returned to the A's as hitting and catchers coach in 2013. He was selected by the St. Louis Cardinals in the 30th round of the 2007 MLB Draft.

Head coaching record

This table depicts Derba's record as a head coach.

References

External links

List of current NCAA Division I baseball coaches

Living people
1985 births
Manhattan Jaspers baseball players
Chatham Anglers players
Batavia Muckdogs players
Swing of the Quad Cities players
Palm Beach Cardinals players
Springfield Cardinals players
Memphis Redbirds players
Baseball catchers
NJIT Highlanders baseball coaches
Manhattan Jaspers baseball coaches
Cape Cod Baseball League coaches
Maine Black Bears baseball coaches
Archbishop Molloy High School alumni
Baseball coaches from New York (state)
Sportspeople from Queens, New York
Baseball players from New York City